John William Hart (July 30, 1833 – June 2, 1907) was a soldier from Maryland who fought in the American Civil War. He received the United States' highest medal for bravery during combat, the Medal of Honor, for his actions during the Battle of Gettysburg on 2 July 1863. He was issued the medal on 3 August 1897.

Biography
Hart was born July 30, 1833 in Germany but migrated to the United States and settling in Maryland prior to the American Civil War. Hart enlisted into Company D, 6th Pennsylvania Reserves (also known as the 35th Pennsylvania Infantry) in Cumberland, Maryland.

On the second day of fighting in the Battle of Gettysburg Union forces had been forced to fall back due to the superior numbers of the opposing Confederate force. As more Union troops arrived to fight however the battle started to shift. In an area known as Devil's Den, John Hart, along with Thaddeus S. Smith, J. Levi Roush, George Mears, Chester S. Furman and Wallace W. Johnson volunteered to attack a small log cabin being held by Confederate forces. Although they attempted to approach the cabin by stealth, they were spotted and began taking fire from the enemy force locked inside. Hart and the other men rushed through the enemy fire and forced their way into the cabin. Before they could start shooting the confederate soldiers surrendered and were taken back to Union lines as prisoners. For their actions during this incident, all six men received the Medal of Honor.

After the war, Hart returned to Maryland, married his wife Christina and had five children, three boys and two girls.

He died June 2, 1907, in Cumberland, Maryland and is buried in Saint Lukes Lutheran Cemetery. When his wife Christina died in 1926, she was buried with him.

Medal of Honor citation

See also
 List of American Civil War Medal of Honor recipients: G–L
 List of Medal of Honor recipients for the Battle of Gettysburg
 6th Pennsylvania Reserve Regiment
 Battle of Gettysburg

Notes

References 

 

 

1833 births
1907 deaths
People of Pennsylvania in the American Civil War
Union Army soldiers
United States Army Medal of Honor recipients
American Civil War recipients of the Medal of Honor
German emigrants to the United States
Military personnel from Cumberland, Maryland